The Puntledge River is a small river on Vancouver Island, British Columbia, Canada.  It joins the Tsolum River to form the Courtenay River, which enters the Strait of Georgia at the city of Courtenay.

Name origin
The name is derived from that of the Pentlatch people.  Their language, also called Pentlatch, was a Coast Salish language.  The river was officially named by Robert Brown of the Vancouver Island Exploring Expedition in 1854, after the people who lived along it, although Lieut. Mayne of the Royal Engineers had noted the name Puntluch River.

References

Rivers of Vancouver Island
Mid Vancouver Island